Himalaya Roadies is a adventure based Nepalese reality show. It is franchise of the MTV Roadies series. The series is broadcast by the Nepalese network Himalaya TV and airs every week for an hour. The participants receive difficult tasks to complete to become a roadie. Only people of 18 and over are allowed to participate in the show. The last season (Season 4), with the theme of Season of Survival follows the former format of the MTV Roadies. Now, the makers are preparing for fifth season of the television reality show. Suraj Singh Thakuri will replace Raymon Das Shrestha as the host of the show this season onwards. Fifth season is titled as “Journey to Xtreme”. There were four gang leaders namely, Anoop Bikram Shahi, Saman Shrestha(Extreme Athlete), Deeya Maskey and Ashish Rana aka Laure. However , makers have not revealed the gang leaders of fifth season. 
Priyanka Karki was also seen in 3 episodes of Roadies season 3 as a special guest with some super power. The show was previously directed by Aman Pratap Adhikari but now director and producer Simosh Sunwar is directing the show from fourth season onwards....

Plot 
Himalaya Roadies is a reality show based on the popular Indian TV show MTV Roadies. The series is focused on young adults of Nepal seeking adventure. Contestants are given seemingly impossible tasks to push them to their limits. They travel to scenic locations all over Nepal, and the last one to survive is crowned a Himalaya Roadie.

Series

Season 1

Destination
 Mustang, Nepal – Episode 6 – 8
 Pokhara, Nepal – Episode 9 – 12
 Chitwan, Nepal – Episode 13 – 15
 Nawalparasi, Nepal – Episode 16 – 17

Audition

Judges

Rannvijay Singha made his special appearance in the grade finale of 
Himalaya Roadies season-1

Contestants
There were originally 17 contestants at the beginning of the journey. However, in Episode 6, Aashish, Faruk, Gaurav, and Neelam were eliminated after receiving the most votes from their fellow contestants.

Roadies’ presence 

Episode 1-5 was the Audition Round and from Episode 6 onwards, the competition officially started.

 = indicates that Roadie was present in the episode.

 = indicates that Roadie was absent in the episode.

 = indicates that Roadie was present in the episode but as a part of the audience for watching the Finale rather than as a contestant for the title.

Season 2

Destination
 Mustang, Nepal – Episode 6 – 8
 Pokhara, Nepal – Episode 9 – 12
 Chitwan, Nepal – Episode 13 – 15
 Nawalparasi, Nepal – Episode 16 – 17

Audition

Judges

Actor Karma and Nepali boxing champion Maxx was seen in the journey round of Himalaya Roadies Season-2.

Contestants

Roadies’ presence 

Episode 1-5 was the Audition Round and from Episode 6 onwards, the competition officially started.

Notes:
 Indicates the contestant was won the task that week.
 Indicates the contestant was safe that week.
 Indicates the contestant was immune that week.
 Indicates the contestant was in the danger that week.
 Indicates the contestant was eliminated that week.
 The contestant quit the competition.
 Indicates the contestant wild card entry in the competition.
 Indicates the contestant was eliminated outside vote out that week.
 Real Heroes used their hero immunity.
 Indicates the contestant is the runner up.
 Indicates the contestant won the competition.

 = indicates that Roadie was present in the episode.

 = indicates that Roadie was absent in the episode.

 = indicates that Roadie was present in the episode but as a part of the audience for watching the Finale rather than as a contestant for the title.

Season 3

Destination
 Mustang, Nepal – Episode 6 – 8
 Pokhara, Nepal – Episode 9 – 12
 Chitwan, Nepal – Episode 13 – 15
 Nawalparasi, Nepal – Episode 16 – 17

Audition

Judges

Finalists of Mtv Roadies and real hero Bidhan Shrestha and another real hero from Mtv Roadies Bhargsetu were present in the culling round of this season.Similarly, Priyanka Karki was also seen in 3 episodes of Himalaya Roadies where she was present with some game changing super powers and twists.

Contestants

Team Colours:
 Team Saman
 Team Diya
 Team Anoop
 Team Laure

Notes:
 Indicates the contestant was won the task that week.
 Indicates the contestant was safe that week.
 Indicates the contestant was immune that week.
 Indicates the contestant was in the danger that week.
 Indicates the contestant was eliminated that week.
 The contestant quit the competition.
 Indicates the contestant wild card entry in the competition.
 Indicates the contestant was eliminated outside vote out that week.
 Real Heroes used their hero immunity.
 Indicates the contestant is the runner up.
 Indicates the contestant won the competition.

Season 4

Destination
 Kathmandu, Nepal – Episode 1
 Chitwan, Nepal – Episode 2
 Dharan, Nepal – Episode 3
 Pokhara, Nepal – Episode 4
 Nepalgunj, Nepal – Episode 5

Audition

Judges

Like other seasons of the show this season also saw some famous Nepali faces. Vten was seen in audition round of the show. Whereas, Nischal Basnet and winner of season 3 Sujan Subedi were seen in the finale of this season to boost the contestent's energy.

Contestants

References

External links
 Yamaha Roadies

Nepalese reality television series
Television shows set in Nepal
MTV Roadies
2017 Nepalese television series debuts